Christian Demirtaş (born 25 May 1984) is a German former professional footballer who manages VfR Aalen. He played as a right-back.

Career 
Demirtaş joined Swedish club Syrianska FC in summer 2012.

He ended his playing career in 2016 and continued as a coach at Würzburger Kickers.

In February 2022 he succeeded Uwe Wolf as manager of VfR Aalen.

Personal life
Demirtas is of Aramean descent, with roots in Turkey near the Syrian border.

References

External links 
 
 

1984 births
Living people
German footballers
German people of Assyrian/Syriac descent
German people of Turkish descent
Association football fullbacks
Assyrian footballers
Bundesliga players
2. Bundesliga players
3. Liga players
1. FSV Mainz 05 players
1. FSV Mainz 05 II players
Karlsruher SC players
Karlsruher SC II players
FC Carl Zeiss Jena players
Syrianska FC players
Würzburger Kickers players
German expatriate footballers
German expatriate sportspeople in Sweden
Expatriate footballers in Sweden
Sportspeople from Offenbach am Main
Footballers from Hesse